IEEE Transactions on Mobile Computing is a bimonthly peer-reviewed scientific journal covering technology related to the mobility of users, systems, data and computing. It was established in 2002 and is published by the IEEE Computer Society. The editor-in-chief is Marwan M. Krunz (University of Arizona). According to the Journal Citation Reports, the journal has a 2021 impact factor of 6.075.

References

External links
 

Transactions on Mobile Computing
Computer science journals
Bimonthly journals
English-language journals
Publications established in 2002